James Clutterbuck (born 18 August 1973) is a former English cricketer.  Clutterbuck was a right-handed batsman who bowled right-arm medium pace.  He was born in Sandown on the Isle of Wight.

Clutterbuck represented the Surrey Cricket Board in a single List A cricket match against Norfolk in the 1999 NatWest Trophy.  In his only List A match, he scored 11 runs.
Clutterbuck scored one of the fastest centuries on record at Arundel cricket ground in an innings for the Earl of Arundel's XI v Cambridge University in 1999 in an innings of 130 off 66 balls. He also represented both Glamorgan and Gloucestershire 2nd XIs during the 1990s.

References

External links
James Clutterbuck at Cricinfo
James Clutterbuck at CricketArchive

1973 births
Living people
People from Sandown
Sportspeople from the Isle of Wight
English cricketers
Surrey Cricket Board cricketers